In mathematics, a CAT(k) group is a group that acts discretely, cocompactly and isometrically on a CAT(k) space.

References

 

 

Group actions (mathematics)